Joaquín "Quino" Sierra Vallejo (born 6 September 1945) is a Spanish former footballer who played as a forward and made seven appearances for the Spain national team.

Career
Quino made his debut for Spain on 15 October 1969 in a 1970 FIFA World Cup qualification match against Finland, which finished as a 6–0 win, where he scored Spain's final goal of the match in the 85th minute. He went on to make seven appearances, scoring three goals, before making his last appearance on 11 October 1972 in the 1–0 win against Argentina.

Career statistics

International

International goals

References

External links
 
 
 

1945 births
Living people
Footballers from Seville
Spanish footballers
Spain international footballers
Association football forwards
Real Betis players
Valencia CF players
Cádiz CF players
La Liga players
Segunda División players